The pont de l'Île is a covered bridge near the municipality of Clerval, Quebec, Canada. It connects an island, L'Île-Nepawa, in Lake Abitibi to the mainland.

The single-lane bridge is of Lattice truss bridge design. This design was modified by the Quebec Ministry of Colonisation and was used for more than 500 covered bridges in Quebec. Thirty-four covered bridges were built in Abitibi, during the colonisation of the region. Today fewer than half of them are extant.

Built in 1946, a metal pillar was added in 1997. In 2012 the bridge was restored, including a new roof, new woodwork, and it was painted red, having been beige.

The weight capacity is 12 tonnes. It does not benefit from any provincial or municipal protection.

See also 
 List of covered bridges in Quebec

References 

Buildings and structures in Abitibi-Témiscamingue

Bridges completed in 1946
Covered bridges in Canada
Road bridges in Quebec